Smaragdion viride is a species of beetle in the family Cerambycidae, the only species in the genus Smaragdion.

References

Ibidionini
Monotypic beetle genera